In Norse mythology, Váli is a God and the son of the god Odin and the giantess Rindr. Váli has numerous brothers including Thor, Baldr, and Víðarr. He was born for the sole purpose of avenging Baldr, and does this by killing Höðr, who was an unwitting participant, and binding Loki with the entrails of his son Narfi. Váli grew to full adulthood within one day of his birth, and slew Höðr before going on to Loki. He is prophesied to survive Ragnarök.

Longstanding transcription error 
Váli is referred to as the son of Loki, though this is argued by some historians to be an early transcription error. The mistake arises from a single passage in Gylfaginning containing the phrase "Then were taken Loki's sons, Váli and Nari". However, Gylfaginning describes Váli as the son of Odin in two other instances. All other documents found that date from this time refer to Váli only as Odin's son, with the exception of more recent copies of the potentially mistaken text.

Myths 
The Váli myth is referred to in Baldrs draumar:

Rindr will bear Váli
in western halls;
that son of Óðinn
will kill when one night old – 
he will not wash hand,
nor comb head,
before he bears to the pyre
Baldr's adversary.
 — translation by Ursula Dronke

In Völuspá:

There formed from that stem,
which was slender-seeming,
a shaft of anguish, perilous:
Hǫðr started shooting.
A brother of Baldr
was born quickly:
he started – Óðinn's son – 
slaying, at one night old.

And in Prose Edda Gylfaginning (where he is described as Loki's son)
Now Loki was taken truceless, and was brought with them into a certain cave. Thereupon they took three flat stones, and set them on edge and drilled a hole in each stone. Then were taken Loki's sons, Váli and Nari (or Narfi); the Æsir changed Váli into the form of a wolf, and he tore asunder Narfi his brother. And the Æsir took his entrails and bound Loki with them over the three stones: One stands under his shoulders, the second under his loins, the third under his houghs; and those bonds were turned to iron. 
 — translation by Arthur Gilchrist Brodeur

The Prose Edda also mentions him again. Gylfaginning contains this passage:

One is called Ali or Váli, son of Odin and Rindr: He is daring in fights, and a most fortunate marksman.

The same text also states that he will survive Ragnarök, along with his brother Víðarr and the sons of Thor, Móði and Magni.

Parentage 
Early mistranslation or confusion has led to a single mention of a Váli who is a son of Loki: "Þá váru teknir synir Loka, Váli ok Nari eða Narfi" from the Prose Edda, translated as "Then were taken Loki's sons, Váli and Nari". We find the original of the only reference to Váli as the son of Loki, while even the same text refers to Baldr's death being avenged by his brother (in Völuspá 33) as well as Váli being the Son of Odin in Völuspá 51, which is repeated in Baldr's draumar.

In the late period Gesta Danorum we also see that Odin is said to have a son with Rinda that will avenge his other son, Baldr's, death – though in this case the name of this new son is Boe rather than Váli. In all these tales Odin goes out immediately – either through seduction, deception, or force – to sire this son.

Similarly where each of these documents ascribe Váli the role of Loki's son we see only in the postscript or translation notes that this transformation was a punishment when in fact the gift of wolf's strength and rage is well attested as being granted by Odin to warriors known as ulfhednar, which would make his son Váli a Berserker and a possible origin for the ulfhednar legend.

Finally we see a different description in Hauksbók. In this version of Völuspá, stanza 34 begins: "Þá kná Vála | vígbǫnd snúa", usually amended to the nominative Váli in order to provide a subject for the verb; Ursula Dronke translates it as "Then did Váli | slaughter bonds twist" which presumably refers to Váli, son of Óðinn, who was begotten to avenge Baldr's death, and thus it is likely that he bound Loki, while it is highly improbable that it refers to a Váli, son of Loki, who is attested nowhere but one line of the Prose Edda.

Footnotes

References

 

 

Æsir
Baldr
Jötnar
Sons of Odin
Vengeance gods
Norse gods